Irene Beatriz de Mattos Brietzke (December 7, 1944 – September 14, 2021) was a Brazilian actress and theatre director.

Life and career
Brietzke debuted as an actress in 1966 in the children's play "Quatro pessoas passam enquanto as lentilhas cozinham" by Stuart Walker, directed by Ivo Bender.

The following year, she began to study theater at the Center of Dramatic Art of the Federal University of Rio Grande do Sul. In the course, she participated in montages with texts by Lorca ("Dona Rosita, a solteira", 1967), Brecht and Weill ("A ópera dos três vinténs", 1969) and Ésquilo ("Agamemnon", 1971). As a job of diplomacy, she directed "A cantora careca", by Eugène Ionesco.

In 1971, she graduated in letters and theater direction from the Federal University of Rio Grande do Sul. Two years later, she completed her graduate studies in theater at the University of Denver in the United States. Back in Porto Alegre, in 1976 she became professor of theater direction and interpretation in the Department of Dramatic Art of the Federal University of Rio Grande do Sul.

Filmography
 2015: Seashore (movie).... Marisa
 2014: Doce de mãe (series) .... Carlinda
 2011: "Três vezes por semana (short film) .... Sílvia
 2011: "Homens de Bem" (telefilm) .... Miranda
 2011: "Até a vista" (short film) .... Bruja
 2010: Antes Que o Mundo Acabe (feature film) .... Glória
 2008-09: "Fantasias de uma dona de casa" (TV series, 8 episodes) .... Ivone
 2007: Saneamento Básico  (feature film).... pedagogue
 2003: The Man Who Copied (feature film) ....supermarket customer
 2003: "Miriam" (short film) .... Miriam
 2002: "Houve uma vez dois verões" .... Inácio's mother (voice)
 1997: "Ângelo anda sumido" (short film) .... third floor woman
 1997: "A comédia da vida privada" (Episode: Anchietanos) .... English Teacher
 1990: "Heimweh/Nostalgia" (feature film) ....

As theatre director
 2002: "Almas gêmeas", of Martha Medeiros
 2000: "Rio Grande do Sul em música e dança"
 2000: "Trem-bala", of Martha Medeiros
 1998: "Noite Brecht", from Brecht and Weill songs
 1996: "Biba, Dudu, Molenga e Chorona" (childlike)
 1995: "O menino maluquinho, of Ziraldo (childlike)
 1994: "Um homem é um homem", of Brecht
 1986: "Parentes entre parênteses", of Flávio de Souza
 1987: "Peer Gynt", of Henrik Ibsen
 1988: "Mahagonny, of Brecht and Weill
 1985: "A aurora da minha vida", of Naum Alves de Souza
 1984: "O casamento do pequeno burguês"
 1983: "No natal a gente vem te buscar", of Naum Alves de Souza
 1982: "O Rei da Vela, of Oswald de Andrade
 1981: "Happy end", of Brecht, Weill and Elisabeth Hauptmann
 1980: "Salão grená", from Brecht and Weill songs
 1979: "Praça de Retalhos", of Carlos Meceni (infantil)
 1979: "Frankie, frankie, Frankenstein", based on Mary Shelley
 1978: "O casamento do pequeno burguês", of Brecht
 1971: "A cantora careca", of Ionesco

References

External links 
 

1944 births
2021 deaths
Actresses from Rio Grande do Sul
Brazilian people of German descent
Brazilian film actresses
Brazilian stage actresses
Brazilian theatre directors
People from Porto Alegre
Federal University of Rio Grande do Sul alumni
University of Denver alumni